The 1986–87 Seattle SuperSonics season was the 20th season of the Seattle SuperSonics in the National Basketball Association. Bernie Bickerstaff returned for his second season as head coach of the franchise and, despite a modest improvement over their previous season's 31–51 record, managed to clinch a spot in the playoffs, where they defeated the Dallas Mavericks in four games in the First Round, and then the Houston Rockets in six games in the Semi-finals, reaching the Western Conference Finals, only to be swept in four games to the eventual NBA champion Los Angeles Lakers. The 39-43 Sonics remain the last team to date in the NBA to win a playoff series with a losing regular season record.

It is also their first year without team captain Jack Sikma as he was traded in the offseason.

Draft picks

Roster

|-

Regular season

Season standings

Record vs. opponents

Game log

|- align="center" bgcolor="bbffbb"
|| 1 || October 31 || vs Portland Trail Blazers || 110-127 || Tom Chambers (27) || Memorial Coliseum12,666 || 1–0
|-

|- align="center" bgcolor="bbffbb"
|| 2 || November 1 || Sacramento Kings || 103-114 || Xavier McDaniel (27) || Seattle Center Coliseum6,296 || 2–0
|- align="center" bgcolor="ffbbbb"
|| 3 || November 4 || Los Angeles Lakers || 110-96 || Tom Chambers (21) || Seattle Center Coliseum10,426 || 2–1
|- align="center" bgcolor="ffbbbb"
|| 4 || November 6 || Dallas Mavericks || 147-124 || Xavier McDaniel (28) || Seattle Center Coliseum8,363 || 2–2
|- align="center" bgcolor="bbffbb"
|| 5 || November 8 || New York Knicks || 102-105 || Dale Ellis (29) || Seattle Center Coliseum9,280 || 3–2
|- align="center" bgcolor="ffbbbb"
|| 6 || November 11 || Philadelphia 76ers || 121-114 || Tom Chambers (33) || Seattle Center Coliseum12,600 || 3–3
|- align="center" bgcolor="ffbbbb"
|| 7 || November 12 || vs Los Angeles Lakers || 122-97 || Xavier McDaniel (17) || The Forum13,694 || 3–4
|- align="center" bgcolor="bbffbb"
|| 8 || November 15 || vs Golden State Warriors || 121-127 || Tom Chambers (38) || Oakland-Alameda County Coliseum Arena7,655 || 4–4
|- align="center" bgcolor="bbffbb"
|| 9 || November 18 || Sacramento Kings || 105-119 || Dale Ellis (28) || Seattle Center Coliseum5,411 || 5–4
|- align="center" bgcolor="ffbbbb"
|| 10 || November 20 || Milwaukee Bucks || 116-105 || Tom Chambers (35) || Seattle Center Coliseum8,790 || 5–5
|- align="center" bgcolor="bbffbb"
|| 11 || November 22 || Indiana Pacers || 111-121 || Tom Chambers (35) || Seattle Center Coliseum6,399 || 6–5
|- align="center" bgcolor="bbffbb"
|| 12 || November 25 || Los Angeles Clippers || 103-113 || Dale Ellis (35) || Seattle Center Coliseum4,702 || 7–5
|- align="center" bgcolor="ffbbbb"
|| 13 || November 26 || vs Utah Jazz || 127-91 || Tom Chambers (22) || Salt Palace10,512 || 7–6
|- align="center" bgcolor="bbffbb"
|| 14 || November 28 || vs Phoenix Suns || 104-117 || Dale Ellis (34) || Arizona Veterans Memorial Coliseum10,462 || 8–6

|- align="center" bgcolor="ffbbbb"
|| 15 || December 2 || Chicago Bulls || 115-109 (OT) || Xavier McDanielTom Chambers(29) || Seattle Center Coliseum13,438 || 8–7
|- align="center" bgcolor="bbffbb"
|| 16 || December 4 || vs San Antonio Spurs || 102-109 || Tom Chambers (36) || HemisFair Arena5,893 || 9–7
|- align="center" bgcolor="bbffbb"
|| 17 || December 6 || vs Houston Rockets || 80-136 || Tom Chambers (29) || The Summit16,016 || 10–7
|- align="center" bgcolor="ffbbbb"
|| 18 || December 10 || vs Los Angeles Clippers || 101-94 || Tom Chambers (28) || Los Angeles Memorial Sports Arena5,573 || 10–8
|- align="center" bgcolor="bbffbb"
|| 19 || December 11 || San Antonio Spurs || 107-113 || Xavier McDaniel (33) || Seattle Center Coliseum5,056 || 11–8
|- align="center" bgcolor="ffbbbb"
|| 20 || December 13 || Dallas Mavericks || 126-109 || Tom ChambersDale Ellis(24) || Seattle Center Coliseum9,789 || 11–9
|- align="center" bgcolor="ffbbbb"
|| 21 || December 16 || vs Portland Trail Blazers || 126-118 || Dale Ellis (34) || Memorial Coliseum12,666 || 11–10
|- align="center" bgcolor="bbffbb"
|| 22 || December 18 || Houston Rockets || 100-114 || Dale Ellis (33) || Seattle Center Coliseum7,696 || 12–10
|- align="center" bgcolor="bbffbb"
|| 23 || December 19 || vs Phoenix Suns || 106-108 || Dale Ellis (28) || Arizona Veterans Memorial Coliseum10,433 || 13–10
|- align="center" bgcolor="ffbbbb"
|| 24 || December 21 || Golden State Warriors || 121-112 || Tom Chambers (25) || Seattle Center Coliseum5,228 || 13–11
|- align="center" bgcolor="bbffbb"
|| 25 || December 23 || Denver Nuggets || 116-127 || Tom Chambers (35) || Seattle Center Coliseum7,459 || 14–11
|- align="center" bgcolor="bbffbb"
|| 26 || December 26 || Los Angeles Clippers || 107-113 || Tom Chambers (27) || Seattle Center Coliseum6,353 || 15–11
|- align="center" bgcolor="ffbbbb"
|| 27 || December 28 || Portland Trail Blazers || 127-118 || Xavier McDaniel (30) || Seattle Center Coliseum9,365 || 15–12
|- align="center" bgcolor="ffbbbb"
|| 28 || December 30 || Boston Celtics || 104-102 || Xavier McDaniel (25) || Seattle Center Coliseum14,600 || 15–13

|- align="center" bgcolor="ffbbbb"
|| 29 || January 2 || vs Dallas Mavericks || 117-107 || Dale Ellis (28) || Reunion Arena17,007 || 15–14
|- align="center" bgcolor="ffbbbb"
|| 30 || January 3 || vs Houston Rockets || 138-114 || Xavier McDanielDale Ellis(21) || The Summit16,016 || 15–15
|- align="center" bgcolor="bbffbb"
|| 31 || January 6 || Phoenix Suns || 108-138 || Tom Chambers (29) || Seattle Center Coliseum5,764 || 16–15
|- align="center" bgcolor="bbffbb"
|| 32 || January 8 || vs Golden State Warriors || 108-115 || Dale Ellis (35) || Oakland-Alameda County Coliseum Arena7,790 || 17–15
|- align="center" bgcolor="bbffbb"
|| 33 || January 11 || Utah Jazz || 111-127 || Tom Chambers (31) || Seattle Center Coliseum7,594 || 18–15
|- align="center" bgcolor="ffbbbb"
|| 34 || January 13 || vs Denver Nuggets || 117-109 || Tom Chambers (30) || McNichols Sports Arena8,981 || 18–16
|- align="center" bgcolor="bbffbb"
|| 35 || January 14 || San Antonio Spurs || 104-130 || Dale Ellis (32) || Seattle Center Coliseum5,068 || 19–16
|- align="center" bgcolor="ffbbbb"
|| 36 || January 16 || Denver Nuggets || 100-134 || Xavier McDaniel (30) || Seattle Center Coliseum8,544 || 20–16
|- align="center" bgcolor="ffbbbb"
|| 37 || January 17 || vs Sacramento Kings || 125-115 || Xavier McDaniel (37) || ARCO Arena (I)10,333 || 20–17
|- align="center" bgcolor="ffbbbb"
|| 38 || January 21 || vs Philadelphia 76ers || 129-123 (OT) || Dale Ellis (40) || The Spectrum11,891 || 20–18
|- align="center" bgcolor="bbffbb"
|| 39 || January 23 || vs New Jersey Nets || 120-125 || Xavier McDaniel (32) || Brendan Byrne Arena9,182 || 21–18
|- align="center" bgcolor="ffbbbb"
|| 40 || January 24 || vs Atlanta Hawks || 97-87 || Dale Ellis (27) || Omni Coliseum13,842 || 21–19
|- align="center" bgcolor="bbffbb"
|| 41 || January 26 || vs Utah Jazz || 95-108 || Dale Ellis (34) || Salt Palace12,212 || 22–19
|- align="center" bgcolor="bbffbb"
|| 42 || January 28 || Los Angeles Lakers || 101-125 || Tom Chambers (37) || Seattle Center Coliseum14,634 || 23–19
|- align="center" bgcolor="ffbbbb"
|| 43 || January 30 || vs Golden State Warriors || 127-119 || Tom Chambers (36) || Oakland-Alameda County Coliseum Arena9,276 || 23–20
|- align="center" bgcolor="bbffbb"
|| 44 || January 31 || Phoenix Suns || 112-118 (OT) || Dale Ellis (24) || Seattle Center Coliseum9,344 || 24–20

|- align="center" bgcolor="bbffbb"
|| 45 || February 2 || New Jersey Nets || 100-108 || Xavier McDaniel (35) || Seattle Center Coliseum6,132 || 25–20
|- align="center" bgcolor="ffbbbb"
|| 46 || February 4 || vs Dallas Mavericks || 124-94 || Tom Chambers (19) || Reunion Arena17,007 || 25–21
|- align="center" bgcolor="ffbbbb"
|| 47 || February 5 || vs San Antonio Spurs || 117-111 || Xavier McDaniel (26) || HemisFair Arena7,548 || 25–22
|- align="center" bgcolor="ffbbbb"
|| 48 || February 10 || Atlanta Hawks || 125-113 || Tom Chambers (35) || Seattle Center Coliseum12,004 || 25–23
|- align="center" bgcolor="ffbbbb"
|| 49 || February 12 || vs Milwaukee Bucks || 106-104 || Tom Chambers (32) || MECCA Arena11,052 || 25–24
|- align="center" bgcolor="ffbbbb"
|| 50 || February 13 || vs Chicago Bulls || 106-98 || Xavier McDaniel (27) || Chicago Stadium16,251 || 25–25
|- align="center" bgcolor="ffbbbb"
|| 51 || February 16 || vs Cleveland Cavaliers || 105-94 || Dale Ellis (17) || Coliseum at Richfield12,163 || 25–26
|- align="center" bgcolor="ffbbbb"
|| 52 || February 18 || vs Indiana Pacers || 105-88 || Dale Ellis (24) || Market Square Arena9,077 || 25–27
|- align="center" bgcolor="ffbbbb"
|| 53 || February 19 || vs Detroit Pistons || 117-105 || Dale Ellis (31) || Pontiac Silverdome14,482 || 25–28
|- align="center" bgcolor="bbffbb"
|| 54 || February 21 || Washington Bullets || 93-110 || Tom Chambers (31) || Seattle Center Coliseum11,637 || 26–28
|- align="center" bgcolor="bbffbb"
|| 55 || February 23 || Los Angeles Clippers || 112-124 || Dale Ellis (29) || Seattle Center Coliseum5,528 || 27–28
|- align="center" bgcolor="ffbbbb"
|| 56 || February 24 || vs Utah Jazz || 133-103 || Dale Ellis (26) || Salt Palace12,212 || 27–29
|- align="center" bgcolor="bbffbb"
|| 57 || February 26 || Denver Nuggets || 100-106 || Xavier McDaniel (30) || Seattle Center Coliseum7,691 || 28–29
|- align="center" bgcolor="bbffbb"
|| 58 || February 28 || vs Phoenix Suns || 105-112 || Dale Ellis (40) || Arizona Veterans Memorial Coliseum13,338 || 29–29

|- align="center" bgcolor="bbffbb"
|| 59 || March 2 || Cleveland Cavaliers || 107-123 || Tom Chambers (36) || Seattle Center Coliseum6,488 || 30–29
|- align="center" bgcolor="ffbbbb"
|| 60 || March 4 || vs Los Angeles Lakers || 138-124 || Dale Ellis (32) || The Forum17,505 || 30–30
|- align="center" bgcolor="bbffbb"
|| 61 || March 5 || Portland Trail Blazers || 122-127 || Dale Ellis (38) || Seattle Center Coliseum10,205 || 31–30
|- align="center" bgcolor="bbffbb"
|| 62 || March 7 || Houston Rockets || 115-118 || Tom Chambers (29) || Seattle Center Coliseum14,474 || 32–30
|- align="center" bgcolor="ffbbbb"
|| 63 || March 10 || vs Houston Rockets || 127-136 (2OT) || Tom Chambers (42) || The Summit16,279 || 33–30
|- align="center" bgcolor="ffbbbb"
|| 64 || March 11 || vs Dallas Mavericks || 130-117 || Tom ChambersDale EllisXavier McDaniel(21) || Reunion Arena17,007 || 33–31
|- align="center" bgcolor="ffbbbb"
|| 65 || March 13 || vs Los Angeles Clippers || 108-104 || Tom Chambers (31) || Los Angeles Memorial Sports Arena6,522 || 33–32
|- align="center" bgcolor="ffbbbb"
|| 66 || March 15 || vs Sacramento Kings || 107-106 || Dale Ellis (40) || ARCO Arena (I)10,333 || 33–33
|- align="center" bgcolor="bbffbb"
|| 67 || March 16 || San Antonio Spurs || 111-122 || Dale Ellis (33) || Seattle Center Coliseum5,934 || 34–33
|- align="center" bgcolor="ffbbbb"
|| 68 || March 19 || vs Washington Bullets || 110-106 || Xavier McDaniel (20) || Capital Centre5,987 || 34–34
|- align="center" bgcolor="ffbbbb"
|| 69 || March 20 || vs Boston Celtics || 112-108 || Dale Ellis (31) || Boston Garden14,890 || 34–35
|- align="center" bgcolor="bbffbb"
|| 70 || March 23 || vs New York Knicks || 121-126 (OT) || Xavier McDaniel (40) || Madison Square Garden (IV)9,038 || 35–35
|- align="center" bgcolor="ffbbbb"
|| 71 || March 26 || vs Denver Nuggets || 123-113 || Xavier McDaniel (33) || McNichols Sports Arena10,183 || 35–36
|- align="center" bgcolor="ffbbbb"
|| 72 || March 27 || Golden State Warriors || 106-105 || Xavier McDaniel (31) || Seattle Center Coliseum9,091 || 35–37
|- align="center" bgcolor="ffbbbb"
|| 73 || March 29 || Detroit Pistons || 108-107 || Xavier McDaniel (27) || Seattle Center Coliseum8,717 || 35–38
|- align="center" bgcolor="bbffbb"
|| 74 || March 31 || Sacramento Kings || 129-132 || Tom Chambers (36) || Seattle Center Coliseum6,095 || 36–38

|- align="center" bgcolor="ffbbbb"
|| 75 || April 2 || Los Angeles Lakers || 117-114 || Xavier McDaniel (35) || Seattle Center Coliseum14,739 || 36–39
|- align="center" bgcolor="ffbbbb"
|| 76 || April 4 || Portland Trail Blazers || 126-123 || Tom Chambers (34) || Seattle Center Coliseum12,227 || 36–40
|- align="center" bgcolor="ffbbbb"
|| 77 || April 7 || Phoenix Suns || 127-125 (OT) || Dale Ellis (35) || Seattle Center Coliseum6,585 || 36–41
|- align="center" bgcolor="ffbbbb"
|| 78 || April 10 || vs Portland Trail Blazers || 121-115 || Tom Chambers (27) || Memorial Coliseum12,666 || 36–42
|- align="center" bgcolor="bbffbb"
|| 79 || April 14 || Utah Jazz || 102-103 || Tom Chambers (30) || Seattle Center Coliseum7,178 || 37–42
|- align="center" bgcolor="bbffbb"
|| 80 || April 16 || vs Los Angeles Clippers || 87-118 || Dale Ellis (41) || Los Angeles Memorial Sports Arena6,517 || 38–42
|- align="center" bgcolor="ffbbbb"
|| 81 || April 18 || Golden State Warriors || 132-127 || Tom Chambers (31) || Seattle Center Coliseum9,428 || 38–43
|- align="center" bgcolor="bbffbb"
|| 82 || April 19 || vs Los Angeles Lakers || 104-110 || Xavier McDaniel (39) || The Forum17,505 || 39–43

 Green background indicates win.
 Red background indicates loss.

Playoffs

|- align="center" bgcolor="#ffcccc"
| 1
| April 23
| @ Dallas
| L 129–151
| Tom Chambers (35)
| Xavier McDaniel (13)
| Xavier McDaniel (7)
| Reunion Arena17,007
| 0–1
|- align="center" bgcolor="#ccffcc"
| 2
| April 25
| @ Dallas
| W 112–110
| Dale Ellis (32)
| Xavier McDaniel (9)
| Nate McMillan (8)
| Reunion Arena17,007
| 1–1
|- align="center" bgcolor="#ccffcc"
| 3
| April 28
| Dallas
| W 117–107
| Dale Ellis (43)
| Dale Ellis (14)
| Nate McMillan (9)
| Hec Edmundson Pavilion8,150
| 2–1
|- align="center" bgcolor="#ccffcc"
| 4
| April 30
| Dallas
| W 124–98
| Tom Chambers (31)
| Chambers, Ellis (9)
| Nate McMillan (9)
| Hec Edmundson Pavilion8,150
| 3–1
|-

|- align="center" bgcolor="#ccffcc"
| 1
| May 2
| @ Houston
| W 111–106 (OT)
| Dale Ellis (34)
| Tom Chambers (9)
| Nate McMillan (8)
| The Summit16,279
| 1–0
|- align="center" bgcolor="#ccffcc"
| 2
| May 5
| @ Houston
| W 99–97
| Dale Ellis (30)
| Dale Ellis (9)
| Eddie Johnson (8)
| The Summit16,279
| 2–0
|- align="center" bgcolor="#ffcccc"
| 3
| May 7
| Houston
| L 84–102
| Tom Chambers (24)
| Dale Ellis (10)
| McMillan, Young (4)
| Seattle Center Coliseum14,587
| 2–1
|- align="center" bgcolor="#ccffcc"
| 4
| May 9
| Houston
| W 117–102
| Tom Chambers (38)
| Alton Lister (17)
| Nate McMillan (10)
| Seattle Center Coliseum14,559
| 3–1
|- align="center" bgcolor="#ffcccc"
| 5
| May 12
| @ Houston
| L 107–112
| Dale Ellis (27)
| Tom Chambers (9)
| Eddie Johnson (6)
| The Summit16,279
| 3–2
|- align="center" bgcolor="#ccffcc"
| 6
| May 14
| Houston
| W 128–125 (2OT)
| Tom Chambers (37)
| Xavier McDaniel (12)
| Nate McMillan (16)
|Seattle Center Coliseum14,751
| 4–2
|-

|- align="center" bgcolor="#ffcccc"
| 1
| May 16
| @ L.A. Lakers
| L 82–87
| Tom Chambers (28)
| McDaniel, Lister (10)
| Nate McMillan (8)
| The Forum17,505
| 0–1
|- align="center" bgcolor="#ffcccc"
| 2
| May 19
| @ L.A. Lakers
| L 104–112
| Dale Ellis (22)
| Xavier McDaniel (8)
| Nate McMillan (7)
| The Forum17,505
| 0–2
|- align="center" bgcolor="#ffcccc"
| 3
| May 23
| L.A. Lakers
| L 121–122
| Xavier McDaniel (42)
| Xavier McDaniel (10)
| Nate McMillan (15)
| Seattle Center Coliseum14,657
| 0–3
|- align="center" bgcolor="#ffcccc"
| 4
| May 25
| L.A. Lakers
| L 102–133
| Tom Chambers (20)
| Alton Lister (20)
| Kevin Williams (5)
| Seattle Center Coliseum14,477
| 0–4

Player statistics

Season

1. Statistics with the SuperSonics.

Playoffs

Awards and records

Awards
 Dale Ellis won the Most Improved Player Award at the end of the season.
 Tom Chambers participated in the 1987 NBA All-Star Game and won the game's Most Valuable Player Award. He also was named Player of the Week between December 1 and December 7.

Records

Transactions

Overview

Trades

Free agents

Additions

Subtractions

References

See also
 1986–87 NBA season

Seattle SuperSonics seasons